The battalion is currently part of the U.S. Army Engineer School, headquartered at Fort Leonard Wood, Missouri and is a subordinate unit to the 1st Engineer Brigade. The battalion mainly conducts advanced individual training for engineering vertical skills and specialty engineering skills.

Subordinate units 
 A Company 169th Engineer Battalion (12D Diver) Panama City, FL
 B Company 169th Engineer Battalion (12D Diver Phase I, 12R Interior Electrician, 12T Technical Engineer, 12Y Geospatial Engineer) Fort Leonard Wood, MO
 C Company 169th Engineer Battalion (12W Carpenter/Mason) Gulfport, MS
 D Company 169th Engineer Battalion (12K Plumber, 12Q/12PU4 Powerline Distribution Specialist) Sheppard AFB, TX
 FF Detachment (12M Firefighter) Goodfellow AFB, TX
 Sapper Leader Course (ASI S4 Sapper Leader) Fort Leonard Wood, MO

History and lineage 
Shortly after the battalion was formed in 1943 at Camp Beale, California, it first saw combat during the Allied Invasion of Italy in September 1944. The battalion fought its way up the Italian Peninsula. After the capture of Rome, the 169th played a significant role in the seven-month campaign to push the Nazi Army through the Apennines and out of the Po Valley of Northern Italy. Throughout their campaign in Italy, the soldiers of the 169th cleared minefields and tank obstacles, destroyed enemy bunkers, cleared roadways, built many bridges to replace those destroyed by the retreating enemy, removed barbwire obstacles, built enemy prisoner of war compounds, and fought as Infantry when the need arose. The battalion received the Rome, North Apennines, and the Po Valley campaign streamers as a result of their courageous service in Italy during World War II.

Beginning in 1954, the battalion spent twelve years at Fort Stewart, Georgia before their next major period of active service in Vietnam. At Fort Stewart, the battalion’s mission was to construct, rehabilitate and maintain military routes of communications and facilities, and perform related engineering work in the communications zone and rear areas of the combat zone. Starting in 1966, the 169th served seven years in a war that had no front lines and where the farmer working in the field by day became an enemy attacking by night. This battalion built hundreds of miles of roads and constructed quarters for thousands of American soldiers throughout the Delta region of South Vietnam. They also built bridges, installed culverts, repaired heavy construction equipment, cleared land, and accomplished all the missions associated with heavy engineer construction equipment operators, mechanics, carpenters, plumbers, electricians, structures specialists, and combat engineers. The battalion was reactivated in 1986 and served as Advanced Individual Training unit responsible for the training of various vertical construction specialties. Later that year, the battalion became the 169th Engineer Battalion (Support). In this role, the 169th supported all types of engineer training on Fort Leonard Wood by commanding the staff and faculty company, garrison company, and engineer companies whose mission involved pipelines, quarries, fire fighting, and bridging. In the spring of 1995, the 169th became a One Station Unit Training battalion responsible for training combat engineers, bridge builders, heavy construction equipment operators and mechanics, and engineer technicians for service in today’s Army. The 169th has a credit for 14 campaigns in Southeast Asia and three in World War II. It has also received three meritorious unit commendations and one Vietnam Civil Action Honor Medal.
 Commander/ Assumption Year
 LTC LaMarre, Jean Belair 1955
 LTC Buszalski, Ernest A. 1959
 LTC Rhett, John T.         1962
 LTC Kincy, Willian Jr.         1963
 LTC Day, Franklin R.         1964
 LTC Rees, Marvin W.         1966
 LTC Wray, Willaim R.         1967
 LTC Prentiss, Louis         1968
 LTC Eineigal, Raymond J. 1968
 LTC Flanigan, Clifford         1969
 LTC Anrold, Edward         1969
 LTC McGarry, Robert         1969
 LTC Andre, Nick J.         1970
 LTC Sanders, Connelly         1970
 LTC Smith, Terry         1970
 LTC Baldwin, Jesse         1971
Inactivated 30 Apr 72  Lineage continued as 3rd Bn, 4th Tng Bde, FLW, MO
 LTC McNulty, James W.         1975
 LTC Sigler, James H.      1975
 LTC Kubo,  Arthur S.         1976
 LTC Franklin, Forrest E. 1978
 LTC Hickman, Carlos W.         1979
 LTC McKee, Anthony J.         1981
 LTC Jenkins, James E.         1983
Reactivated as 169th EN BN (Support), FLW, MO Sept 86
 LTC Mitchell, William H. Jr. 1986
 LTC Woodbury, George A. 1987
 LTC Wank, James         1989
 LTC Moakler, Martin         1991
 LTC Strom, Robert         1993
 LTC Carr, Dale                 1995
 LTC Estes, Allen         1997
 LTC Ockrassa, Brigid         1999
 LTC Drolet, John D.         2000
 LTC Mallery, Jay         2002
 LTC Holbrook, David         2004
 LTC Larsen                 2006
 LTC Kramer                 2008
 LTC Howell                 2010
 LTC Schlosser, Teresa         2012
 LTC Preston, Scott         2014
 LTC Bohrer, Aaron          2016
 LTC Pabis, Justin         2018
 LTC Bowman, Vanessa          2020
 LTC Wheeler, Jeremy         2022
CSM/ Assumption Year
 CSM Moore, Donald G.         1986–1988
 CSM Morgan, Raymond W.         1988–1990
 CSM  Poe, Alvis C.         1990–1992
 CSM Moske, Michael P         1992–1996
 CSM Delgado, David         1996–1998
 CSM Monroe, Bonza         1998–2001
 CSM Adams, Thomas         2001–2002
 CSM Underberg, Richard J. 2002–2004
 CSM Lea,  Linda         2004–2006
 MSG Williams                 2006–2007
 CSM Vigil, Maria         2007–2010
 CSM Kelch                 2010–2012
 CSM Walker, Trever         2012–2014
 CSM Love Anthony         2014–2016
 CSM Danjoint, Moise         2016–2018
 CSM Meade, Kevin         2018–2020
 CSM Christesen, Tommy      2020-2022
 CSM Burgosrodiguez, Alex  2022-

Distinctive unit insignia 

Description: A silver color metal and enamel device 1 1/8 inches (2.86 cm) in height overall consisting of a shield blazoned: Per fess enhanced dovetailed of three Argent and Gules, in base a fleur-de-lis flowered of the first. Attached below the shield is a silver scroll inscribed "MIND AND HAND" in black letters.

Symbolism: Scarlet and white are the colors of the Corps of Engineers. The fleur-de-lis flowered was suggested by the coat of arms of Florence, Italy, where the battalion was activated after being reconstituted in 1944. The dovetail is used to allude to an engineering construction principle. The three points represent the organization's three battle honors awarded for service in Italy during World War II.

Background: The distinctive unit insignia was approved on 26 Jan 1956.

Coat of arms 

Shield: Scarlet and white are the colors of the Corps of Engineers. The fleur-de-lis flowered was suggested by the coat of arms of Florence, Italy, where the battalion was activated after being reconstituted in 1944. The dovetail is used to allude to an engineering construction principle. The three points represent the organization's three battle honors awarded for service in Italy during World War II.

Crest: The many campaigns in which the 169th participated, during the Vietnam War are recalled by the golden dragon, holding an engineer's divider to symbolize the outstanding construction work the unit accomplished in support of military operations during 1967 and 1968. The mountains represent the rugged country in which exacting land development projects were completed and also symbolize the regions in Italy where the unit saw action during World War II, specifically the Po Valley, North Apennines and Rome-Arno. Scarlet denotes courage and recalls three Meritorious Unit Commendations and the Republic of Vietnam Civil Action Honor Medal awarded the 169th in the period 1966 to 1970.

Honors 
169th Engineer Battalion's Lineage and Honors Certificate

Campaign Participation Credit
World War II 
Rome-Arno
North Apennines
Po Valley

Vietnam
Counteroffensive 
Counteroffensive, Phase II 
Counteroffensive, Phase III 
Tet Counteroffensive
Counteroffensive, Phase IV
Counteroffensive, Phase V
Counteroffensive, Phase VI
Tet 69/Counteroffensive
Summer–Fall 1969
Winter–Spring 1970
Sanctuary Counteroffensive
Counteroffensive, Phase VII
Consolidation I
Consolidation II
Cease–Fire

Decorations
Meritorious Unit Commendation (Army), Streamer embroidered VIETNAM 1966–1967 
Meritorious Unit Commendation (Army), Streamer embroidered VIETNAM 1967
Meritorious Unit Commendation (Army), Streamer embroidered 1967–1968 
Republic of Vietnam Civil Action Honor Medal, First Class, Streamer embroidered VIETNAM 1967–1970

References

External links 
 Battalion Facebook Page
 C Co 169th 1966–1971 website 

169